The Prudential Center (colloquially the Pru) is an enclosed shopping mall within the mixed-use Prudential Center complex in the Back Bay neighborhood of Boston, Massachusetts. It is located at the base of the Prudential Tower, and provides direct indoor connections to several nearby destinations including the Hynes Convention Center, the office towers at 101 and 111 Huntington Avenue, and the Sheraton Boston hotel. The mall is connected to the Copley Place shopping mall via a skybridge over Huntington Avenue. As of 2022, the complex currently features a Saks Fifth Avenue, and notable brands such as Earl's, Lacoste, Club Monaco, Ralph Lauren, and Vineyard Vines.

Description 
A Mandarin Oriental hotel is part of the complex, as well as the Avalon and the Belvidere Residences apartments. A large Star Market supermarket is located across a small side street bordering the mall.

The shopping complex is anchored by Saks Fifth Avenue. The mall is home to over 75 specialty retailers, including upscale stores such as Earl's, Lacoste, Club Monaco, Ralph Lauren, Vineyard Vines, and more. The St. Francis Chapel, a functioning Roman Catholic chapel staffed by the Oblates of the Virgin Mary and located inside the shopping center since 1969, offers daily services and a religious giftshop.

Around 20 food-related businesses ranging from quick snacks to fine dining are located at the mall, with many other independent restaurants located nearby outside. A  open-market format Eataly location was opened in November 2016, replacing a former food court within the mall.

Transportation connections include the Prudential subway station and the nearby Hynes Convention Center station, both on branches of the MBTA Green Line. The Back Bay multimodal station, with access to the MBTA Orange Line, MBTA Commuter Rail, and Amtrak inter-city rail, is a short climate-controlled walk away via the adjacent Copley Place shopping mall. Multiple bus routes stop at the center, and there is underground parking available on-site.

History 

The location originally consisted of marshlands next to the Charles River in the Back Bay district of Boston. These wetlands were gradually filled in, and a large railyard was built. In the early 1960s, the railyard was replaced by the Prudential Tower and several smaller buildings.

Originally, only one department store (Saks), along with a handful of shops, existed around the base of the Prudential Tower in a small shopping arcade.  Nearby structures including the Hynes Convention Center, 101 Huntington Avenue office tower, a Sheraton Hotel, and other various shops were separated by open plazas in a patchwork of disjointed buildings.

A large, windswept paved plaza off Boylston Street was dominated by a  sculptural bronze male nude by Boston-educated artist Donald Harcourt De Lue, titled Quest Eternal, and installed in 1967. Popularly known as "The Naked Guy", the 5-ton sculpture, cast in one piece, depicted a Mannerist heroic figure stretched diagonally upwards towards the sky.

In 1991, a plan was put forth to connect all of the buildings together with an enclosed and expanded shopping center, in the area bordered by Boylston Street, Huntington Avenue, and Dalton Street.  The Hahn Company, together with then-owner Prudential Insurance Company of America, spent over two years developing the $100 million project.

In 1993, the new Shops at Prudential Center was completed, and largely successful in filling its new spaces.  Multiple buildings surrounding the Prudential Center were now connected through the shopping arcade, with pedestrian traffic ranging from office workers to convention attendees, able to travel conveniently to various destinations regardless of the weather outside.

In 2014, a new entrance to the Prudential Center was built to replace the remaining open plaza bordering Boylston Street. This required that the Quest Eternal statue be removed, and its whereabouts and future were unknown to the general public. In 2019, the Boston City Council announced that it had accepted the donation of the statue from Boston Properties, and would install it in the public Smith Playground, near the intersection of Western Avenue and North Harvard Street in the Allston district. There remain several smaller works of public art at the Prudential Center complex, including temporary art installations.

On August 24, 2020, it was announced that high end regional division Lord & Taylor would shutter.

On June 30, 2022, it was announced that Dick's Sporting Goods was in final negotiations to take over the Lord & Taylor building at the center for its House of Sports concept store.

Reception 
In November 2019, the online business news website MassLive rated the Shops at Prudential Center as fifth, and the immediately adjacent Copley Place as fourth best among 40 malls and shopping centers in Massachusetts.

Gallery

References

External links
 Official site
 Prudential Center area map

Shopping malls in Massachusetts
Commercial buildings in Boston
Prudential Financial buildings
Shopping malls established in 1993
1993 establishments in Massachusetts